Exhaust gas or flue gas is emitted as a result of the combustion of fuels such as natural gas, gasoline (petrol), diesel fuel, fuel oil, biodiesel blends, or coal. According to the type of engine, it is discharged into the atmosphere through an exhaust pipe, flue gas stack, or propelling nozzle. It often disperses downwind in a pattern called an exhaust plume.

It is a major component of motor vehicle emissions (and from stationary internal combustion engines), which can also include crankcase blow-by and evaporation of unused gasoline.

Motor vehicle emissions are a common source of air pollution and are a major ingredient in the creation of smog in some large cities.  A 2013 study by the Massachusetts Institute of Technology (MIT) indicates that 53,000 early deaths occur per year in the United States alone because of vehicle emissions. According to another study from the same university, traffic fumes alone cause the death of 5,000 people every year just in the United Kingdom.

Composition
The largest part of most combustion gas is nitrogen (N2), water vapor (H2O) (except with pure-carbon fuels), and carbon dioxide (CO2) (except for fuels without carbon); these are not toxic or noxious (although water vapor and carbon dioxide are greenhouse gases that contribute to climate change). A relatively small part of combustion gas is undesirable, noxious, or toxic substances, such as carbon monoxide (CO) from incomplete combustion, hydrocarbons (properly indicated as CxHy, but typically shown simply as "HC" on emissions-test slips) from unburnt fuel, nitrogen oxides (NOx) from excessive combustion temperatures, and particulate matter (mostly soot).

Exhaust gas temperature
Exhaust gas temperature (EGT) is important to the functioning of the catalytic converter of an internal combustion engine. It may be measured by an exhaust gas temperature gauge. EGT is also a measure of engine health in gas-turbine engines (see below).

Cold engines

During the first two minutes after starting the engine of a car that has not been operated for several hours, the amount of emissions can be very high. This occurs for two main reasons:
 Rich air-fuel ratio requirement in cold engines: When a cold engine is started, the fuel does not vaporize completely, creating higher emissions of hydrocarbons and carbon monoxide, which diminishes only as the engine reaches operating temperature. The duration of this start-up phase has been reduced by advances in materials and technology, including computer-controlled fuel injection, shorter intake lengths, and pre-heating of fuel and/or inducted air.
 Inefficient catalytic converter under cold conditions: Catalytic converters are very inefficient until warmed up to their operating temperature. This time has been much reduced by moving the converter closer to the exhaust manifold and even more so placing a small yet quick-to-heat-up converter directly at the exhaust manifold. The small converter handles the start-up emissions, which allows enough time for the larger main converter to heat up. Further improvements can be realised in many ways,  including electric heating, thermal battery, chemical reaction preheating, flame heating and superinsulation.

Passenger car emissions summary

Comparable with the European emission standards EURO III as it was applied on October 2000

In 2000, the United States Environmental Protection Agency began to implement more stringent emissions standards for light duty vehicles. The requirements were phased in beginning with 2004 vehicles and all new cars and light trucks were required to meet the updated standards by the end of 2007.

Types

Internal-combustion engines

Spark-ignition and Diesel engines

In spark-ignition engines the gases resulting from combustion of the fuel and air mix are called exhaust gases. The composition varies from petrol to diesel engines, but is around these levels:

The 10% oxygen for "diesel" is likely if the engine was idling, e.g. in a test rig. It is much less if the engine is running under load, although diesel engines always operate with an excess of air over fuel. 
The CO content for petrol engines varies from ~ 15 ppm for well tuned engine with fuel injection and a catalytic converter up to 100,000 ppm (10%) for a richly tuned carburetor engine, such as typically found on small generators and garden equipment.

Nitromethane additive
Exhaust gas from an internal combustion engine whose fuel includes nitromethane will contain nitric acid vapour, which is corrosive, and when inhaled causes a muscular reaction making it impossible to breathe. People who are likely to be exposed to it should wear a gas mask.

Diesel engines

Gas-turbine engines
In aircraft gas turbine engines, "exhaust gas temperature" (EGT) is a primary measure of engine health. Typically the EGT is compared with a primary engine power indication called "engine pressure ratio" (EPR). For example: at full power EPR there will be a maximum permitted EGT limit. Once an engine reaches a stage in its life where it reaches this EGT limit, the engine will require specific maintenance in order to rectify the problem. The amount the EGT is below the EGT limit is called EGT margin. The EGT margin of an engine will be greatest when the engine is new, or has been overhauled. For most airlines, this information is also monitored remotely by the airline maintenance department by means of ACARS.

Jet engines and rocket engines

In jet engines and rocket engines, exhaust from propelling nozzles which in some applications shows shock diamonds.

Other types

From burning coal
 Flue gas
 Flue gas emissions from fossil fuel combustion

Steam engines
In steam engine terminology the exhaust is steam that is now so low in pressure that it can no longer do useful work.

Main motor vehicle emissions

NOx

Mono-nitrogen oxides NO and NO2 (NOx)(whether produced this way or naturally by lightning) react with ammonia, moisture, and other compounds to form nitric acid vapor and related particles. Small particles can penetrate deeply into sensitive lung tissue and damage it, causing premature death in extreme cases. Inhalation of NO species increases the risk of lung cancer and colorectal cancer. and inhalation of such particles may cause or worsen respiratory diseases such as emphysema and bronchitis and heart disease.

In a 2005 U.S. EPA study the largest emissions of  came from on road motor vehicles, with the second largest contributor being non-road equipment which is mostly gasoline and diesel stations.

The resulting nitric acid may be washed into soil, where it becomes nitrate, which is useful to growing plants.

Volatile organic compounds

When oxides of nitrogen (NOx) and volatile organic compounds (VOCs) react in the presence of sunlight, ground level ozone is formed, a primary ingredient in smog.  A 2005 U.S. EPA report gives road vehicles as the second largest source of VOCs in the U.S. at 26% and 19% are from non road equipment which is mostly gasoline and diesel stations.  27% of VOC emissions are from solvents which are used in the manufacturer of paints and paint thinners and other uses.

Ozone
Ozone is beneficial in the upper atmosphere, but at ground level ozone irritates the respiratory system, causing coughing, choking, and reduced lung capacity. It also has many negative effects throughout the ecosystem.

Carbon monoxide (CO)

Carbon monoxide poisoning is the most common type of fatal air poisoning in many countries. Carbon monoxide is colorless, odorless and tasteless, but highly toxic. It combines with hemoglobin to produce carboxyhemoglobin, which blocks the transport of oxygen. At concentrations above 1000ppm it is considered immediately dangerous and is the most immediate health hazard from running engines in a poorly ventilated space. In 2011, 52% of carbon monoxide emissions were created by mobile vehicles in the U.S.

Hazardous air pollutants (toxics)
Chronic (long-term) exposure to benzene (C6H6) damages bone marrow. It can also cause excessive bleeding and depress the immune system, increasing the chance of infection.  Benzene causes leukemia and is associated with other blood cancers and pre-cancers of the blood.

Particulate matter (PM10 and PM2.5)
The health effects of inhaling airborne particulate matter have been widely studied in humans and animals and include asthma, lung cancer, cardiovascular issues, premature death.  Because of the size of the particles, they can penetrate the deepest part of the lungs.  A 2011 UK study estimates 90 deaths per year due to passenger vehicle PM.  In a 2006 publication, the U.S. Federal Highway Administration (FHWA) state that in 2002 about 1 per-cent of all PM10 and 2 per-cent of all PM2.5 emissions came from the exhaust of on-road motor vehicles (mostly from diesel engines). In Chinese, European, and Indian markets, both diesel and gasoline vehicles are required to have a tailpipe filter installed, while the United States has mandated it for diesel only. In 2022, British testing specialist Emissions Analytics estimated that the 300 million or so gasoline vehicles in the US over the subsequent decade would emit around 1.6 septillion harmful particles.

Carbon dioxide (CO2)
Carbon dioxide is a greenhouse gas.  Motor vehicle CO2 emissions are part of the anthropogenic contribution to the growth of CO2 concentrations in the atmosphere which according to the vast majority of the scientific community is causing climate change.  Motor vehicles are calculated to generate about 20% of the European Union's man-made CO2 emissions, with passenger cars contributing about 12%. European emission standards limit the CO2 emissions of new passenger cars and light vehicles. The European Union average new car CO2 emissions figure dropped by 5.4% in the year to the first quarter of 2010, down to 145.6 g/km.

Water vapour
Vehicle exhaust contains much water vapour.

Water recovery
There has been research into ways that troops in deserts can recover drinkable water from their vehicles' exhaust gases.

Pollution reduction

Emission standards focus on reducing pollutants contained in the exhaust gases from vehicles as well as from industrial flue gas stacks and other air pollution exhaust sources in various large-scale industrial facilities such as petroleum refineries, natural gas processing plants, petrochemical plants and chemical production plants. However, these are often referred to as flue gases. Catalytic converters in cars intend to break down the pollution of exhaust gases using a catalyst. Scrubbers in ships intend to remove the sulfur dioxide (SO2) of marine exhaust gases. The regulations on marine sulfur dioxide emissions are tightening, however only a small number of special areas worldwide have been designated for low sulfur diesel fuel use only.

One of the advantages claimed for advanced steam technology engines is that they produce smaller quantities of toxic pollutants (e.g. oxides of nitrogen) than petrol and diesel engines of the same power.  They produce larger quantities of carbon dioxide but less carbon monoxide due to more efficient combustion.

Health studies
Researchers from the University of California, Los Angeles School of Public Health say preliminary results of their statistical study of children listed in the California Cancer Registry born between 1998 and 2007 found that traffic pollution may be associated with a 5% to 15% increase in the likelihood of some cancers.  A World Health Organization study found that diesel fumes cause an increase in lung cancer.

Localised effects
The California Air Resources Board found in studies that 50% or more of the air pollution (smog) in Southern California is due to car emissions. Concentrations of pollutants emitted from combustion engines may be particularly high around signalized intersections because of idling and accelerations. Computer models often miss this kind of detail.

See also 

 Air pollution#Most polluted cities
 Alternative propulsion
 Atmospheric dispersion modeling
 Automobile#Environmental impact
 Clean Air Act
 Congestion pricing
 Emission standard
 European emission standards
 Flue gas
 Kyoto protocol
 Landfill gas
 Low-emission zone
 Mobile source air pollution
 Motor vehicle emissions and pregnancy
 Rolling coal
 Space jellyfish
 United States emission standards
 Vehicle emissions control

References

External links
 Health and Air Pollution Publication of the California Air Resources Board
 
 
 
About diesel exhaust:
 U.S. Department of Labor Occupational Safety & Health Administration: Safety and Health Topics: Diesel Exhaust
 Partial List of Chemicals Associated with Diesel Exhaust
  Diesel Exhaust Particulates: Reasonably Anticipated to Be A Human Carcinogen
 Scientific Study of Harmful Effects of Diesel Exhaust: Acute Inflammatory Responses in the Airways and Peripheral Blood After Short-Term Exposure to Diesel Exhaust in Healthy Human Volunteers
 Diesel exhaust: what you need to know

Air pollution
Engines
Gases
Smog
Transport and the environment
Pollution